The European Bureau for Conscientious Objection (EBCO) is a European umbrella organisation for national peace organisations supporting conscientious objectors. Its seat is in Brussels and it was founded in 1979. It aims to organise solidarity campaigns for conscientious objectors facing legal charges in European countries and to lobby for such rights in European institutions. Together with War Resisters' International, which is also one of its members, it is considered one of the leading international NGOs working on conscientious objection.

Objectives 
ECBO stands up for the right of conscientious objectors, who claim this right as a human right, to abstain from warfare , its preparations or any other military activity. It lobbies for the right to asylum for conscientious objectors whose governments do not recognise their objections. It promotes  cuts to military budgets and the abolition of conscription.

Activities 
The organisation creates a network between national organisations from Belgium, Bulgaria, Cyprus, France, Germany, Greece, Italy, Russia., Spain, Switzerland, Turkey, Ukraine and United Kingdom. Since 2017, Friedhelm Schneider from Germany acts as the organisation's president.

The organisation lobbied for European countries to sign and ratify the Optional Protocol on the Involvement of Children in Armed Conflict to the Convention on the Rights of the Child.

ECBO writes reports and conducts research on conscientious objection around Europe. Since at least 2008, it writes an annual report on conscientious objection and civilian service for the European Parliament Committee on Civil Liberties, Justice and Home Affairs.

ECBO has participatory status with the Council of Europe since 1998. Since 2005, it is also a member of the INGOs Conference of the Council of Europe. Since 1995, it is a full member of the European Youth Forum.

References 

Peace organisations based in Belgium
International organisations based in Belgium
Conscientious objection organizations
Organizations established in 1979